Dulal Biswas (born 17 November 1973) is an Indian former footballer who played for East Bengal, Mohun Bagan AC and Prayag United. He was the captain of East Bengal for the 1997–1998 season.

Honours 

East Bengal
 IFA Shield: 1994
 Rovers Cup: 1994

Mohun Bagan
 National Football League: 1999–2000, 2001–02
 Rovers Cup: 2000–01
 Sikkim Gold Cup: 2001

References

External links
 http://goal.com/en-india/people/india/25985/dulal-biswas

Indian footballers
1973 births
Living people
Footballers from Kolkata
Association football defenders
East Bengal Club players
Mohun Bagan AC players
United SC players